Jozef "Jef" Fidelo Eygel (5 March 1933 in Antwerp – 3 April 2005) was a Belgian professional basketball player. At a height of 1.84 m (6'0 ") tall, he played at the point guard position.

Professional career
Eygel was a member of the FIBA European Selection, in 1964. He was a four-time Belgian Player of the Year (1959, 1961, 1963, 1964).

National team career
Eygel was a member of the senior Belgian national basketball team. He competed at the 1952 Summer Olympics. He played in all three of Belgium's games during the Olympic tournament.

Awards and accomplishments
7× Belgian League Champion: (1956, 1959, 1960, 1961, 1962, 1963, 1964)
4× Belgian Player of the Year: (1959, 1961, 1963, 1964)
2× Belgian Cup Winner: (1961, 1970)
FIBA European Selection: (1964)

References

External links
FIBA Profile
Profile 

1933 births
2005 deaths
Belgian men's basketball players
Olympic basketball players of Belgium
Basketball players at the 1952 Summer Olympics
Sportspeople from Antwerp
Point guards